Pavitra Rishta (International title: Sacred Relationship) is a 2009 Indian soap opera produced by Ekta Kapoor of Balaji Telefilms, that aired on Zee TV from 1 June 2009 to 25 October 2014. It is an adaptation of Tamil television series Thirumathi Selvam.

In late 2018 and later in 2020 after the death of Rajput, the series was rebroadcast on Zee TV. After this rerun received good ratings, they decided to bring a new series. A web series titled Pavitra Rishta - Its Never too Late aired on Zee5 from 15 September 2021 starring Ankita Lokhande reprising her role as Archana and Shaheer Sheikh as Manav.

Summary
Archana Karanjkar is a hard-working, homely girl. She has studied only till the 8th standard as her mother, Sulochana was ill and was advised bed-rest. Archana took care of the household chores on behalf of Sulochana. That's why, she is the favourite child of her parents.

Sulochana fixes Archana's marriage with Manav Deshmukh, misunderstanding that Manav is a mechanical engineer. Archana has two younger sisters named Varsha and Vaishali and an elder brother named Vinod who is married to a mean woman, Manjusha. Manav lives with his father Damodar, mother Savita, younger brother Sachin and younger sister Vandita in Anand Nivas chawl. Savita is a quarrelsome and combative woman who frequently fights with her chawl neighbours regarding the line of water and petty issues. Archana and Manav marry and her family learns that Manav is a mere mechanic.

Gradually, Archana and Manav fall in love with each other. Manav's brother, Sachin dies in a car accident and his fiancée Shravani is pregnant with his child. Archana and Manav divorce to so that Sachin and Shravani's unborn child has a bright future. Vandita marries Ajit, the younger brother of Manjusha. Manav and Shravani's marriage is fixed, and Archana leaves Mumbai and completes her higher studies. Varsha gets married to Satish Deshpande.

2 years later

Archana is now educated and returns to Mumbai. Shravani has delivered a boy, who is named after Sachin. Sulochana decides to get Archana married to Jaywant. Coincidentally, Manav and Shravani's marriage falls on the same date as Jaywant and Archana's wedding. At last, Manav and Archana marry and hence unite again. Shravani leaves for abroad giving Jr. Sachin to Archana and Manav.

Archana's sister, Vaishali married with Manav's boss, Dharmesh, who dislikes Manav. It is revealed that Dharmesh has another wife named Madhuri and a son named Varun, which leads to a rift in his relationship with Vaishali. Archana gets pregnant but the child dies in her womb itself because Manav couldn't bring money for the operation at the right time. After the loss of their first child, Manav determines to become successful in his life and earn money. He meets a rich businessman named Digvijay Kirloskar and starts working in his company.

4 years later

Due to his determination and hardwork, Manav is now a rich business tycoon. Dharmesh tries to create difficulties in Manav's life but Manav overcomes them. Manav and Archana have a son, Soham. Due to a misunderstanding between a pregnant Varsha and Satish, Varsha aborts her child which prevents her from conceiving ever in her life. Archana gives birth to their twin daughters named Ovi and Tejaswini. Varsha develops a special liking for Soham and abducts him and runs away. They fall into a river and presumed dead. Manav blames Archana for the possible death of their son, giving Savita an opportunity to separate them.

Savita brainwashes Jr. Sachin and makes him believe that Archana loves Soham more than him as he is her biological son, thus making him against Archana. She conspires against Archana. Manav decides to move to Canada with his entire family to further his business with his business partner Digvijay Kirloskar. He sends the plane tickets to Archana through Savita but Savita gives Archana divorce papers instead of the tickets. Archana refuses to divorce Manav but signs on the custody papers of Ovi and Tejaswini, leaving them in the custody of Manav. However, Savita signs on divorce papers instead of Archana, thus copying her signature. She tells Manav that Archana refused to shift to Canada and instead stated that she wants divorce. Manav misunderstands Archana and shifts to Canada with his family. Archana is shattered and adopts a baby girl, Purvi. Vaishali leaves Dharmesh due to his abusive behavior on herself and her children.

18 years later 

Manav returns to India to finalize their divorce, and they are ordered a six-month courtship together. Deshmukhs' return to India. Ovi turns out to be spoilt and over-pampered by her grandmother, Savita, while Tejaswini is frank and tomboyish. Savita has poisoned the minds of Ovi and Tejaswini against Archana, thus they believe Archana as a money-minded and selfish woman who was never bothered about her children. Sachin emotionally blackmails Archana to divorce Manav, so that he could get his biological mother, Shravani married to him. Vaishali lives as a single-mother with her son Aniket. Ovi's marriage is fixed with Arjun, the son of Digvijay, whom she loves from her childhood. But Arjun falls in love in Purvi, being unaware of that she is somehow related to the Deshmukhs'. He soon reveals his true love and breaks his alliance with Ovi, leaving Ovi shattered.

Arjun seeks Archana's permission to marry Purvi but she was angry on him for breaking Ovi's and thus proposes that he earn 10,000 rupees without using the name of his father, to which Arjun agrees. Arjun starts working as a car mechanic and seeing his hardwork and love for Purvi, Archana soon realises that Arjun is the best man for her and fixes their marriage, angering Ovi. Soham and Varsha are revealed to be alive and living in Bihar. Soham is now a goon known as "Vishnu Lala". Varsha has changed her name to Jhumri and is the mistress of a goon named Balan whom Soham knows as his father.

Vinod and Manjusha's daughter, Poornima starts an affair with a rich businessman named Mallik Mittal for money. However, Purvi exposes her, angering her. Due to Poornima's advice, Ovi proposes to Purvi that if she lets Ovi marry Arjun, then Ovi will stop Manav and Archana's divorce. Purvi, whose biggest priority was Archana's happiness, begs Arjun to marry Ovi. On Purvi's behest, Arjun unwillingly marries Ovi. Tejaswini exposes Savita's conspiracy, uniting Archana and Manav. Everyone learns that Vishnu is Manav and Archana's son Soham, but he refuses to accept them as his parents. Balan tries to separate Soham from Archana and Manav. Poornima creates a rift between Ovi and Purvi and makes Ovi think that Arjun is having an extramartial affair with Purvi. To save Ovi and Arjun marriage life, Purvi shifts to Kolkata while Soham, Varsha and Balan are jailed for their crimes.

6 months later

Purvi is pregnant and married to Dr. Onir, a gynecologist. Ovi is also pregnant but has a lot of complications in her pregnancy due to her frequent habit of drinking alcohol. Onir and Purvi return to Mumbai to treat Ovi. It is revealed that before Arjun and Ovi's marriage, Arjun and Purvi had consummated their relationship, so Purvi is actually pregnant with Arjun's child. After Soham's release from jail, Balan asks him to shoot Manav but Soham hesitates and accidentally shoots Archana who falls into a coma. Manav appoints Dr. Gauri Shahane to treat Archana. Ovi loses her child and Purvi switches her child with Ovi's baby with Onir. Purvi and Arjun's daughter is named Pari. Soon, Purvi is exposed. Ovi decides to divorce Arjun and leaves him alone with Pari. Onir pretends to cheat on Purvi with another woman, so that Purvi divorces him, because he is a cancer patient and will die soon. Ovi-Arjun and Onir-Purvi divorce. Archana wakes up from coma and Soham accepts Manav and Archana as his parents. When Archana learns that Pari is Arjun and Purvi's illegitimate daughter, she gets angry on Purvi and Arjun but very soon forgives them. Soham turns into a loving person and leaves Balan's gang. Poornima has married Mallik Mittal, who tries to create difficulties in Manav and Soham's life. Finally, Manav and Archana decide to get Arjun and Purvi married so their daughter, Pari, gets her full family.

A Gujarati family comes to stay in Anand Nivas chawl. The matriach of the family, Snehlata Khandeshi falls into a fight with Savita, on the very day of their arrival, which makes them rivals. Snehlata opens a Gujarati snacks shop with her sister Charulata, from where Savita buys snacks. Tejaswini falls in love with Sunny, the son of Snehlata. But, they have to break up as Savita and Snehlata are rivals. Soham falls in love with Gauri, who is Jr. Sachin's fiancée. He kidnaps Gauri and tries to forcefully marry her in the temple as his family reject his relationship. Gauri gets accidentally shot by Soham and dies. They fall into a river and presumed dead.

Ovi finds that she's pregnant again with Arjun's child and delivers a daughter, Pia. Purvi misunderstands that Arjun has cheated on her. She shifts to Canada with Pari and the entire family.

20 years later

Pari has grown up and hates Arjun as she believes he cheated on her mother, Purvi. Purvi returns to Mumbai and realizes the truth of Pia and Ovi. Arjun is revealed to have a brain tumor. Arjun and Purvi reunite and they move to Australia for Arjun's treatment. Pia helps Ovi to unite with her parents and her family. Jr. Sachin has is married to Neena.

Soham, who is revealed to be alive, lives as Raghav Mahatre, with his children, Ankita, Prashant, Mansi, Pranav and Sonali. He meets his family again but still holds a grudge against them. Ankita, who is exactly lookalike Archana, marries the mentally challenged Naren Karmarkar. Naren is traumatized after his lover Ahaana's death, assumes that Ankita is Ahaana. Naren gets much better, and they consummate their marriage.

On Pari's wedding day, Naren discovers that Pari is Ahaana, and he went again in trauma. Naren regains his memory and expels Ankita from his life. Ankita gives birth to their daughter Ashi. Naren's mother, Rushali steals the baby to Naren and Pari and tells Ankita that her child is died.

5 years later

Pari realizes Ankita and Naren still love each other, and Ashi is their daughter and leaves them. Ankita and Naren unite.

Purvi and Arjun return to Pari, who accepts both her parents after some time and lives as a family. Ovi lives with Pia as a single mother. Manav and Archana forgive Soham and he finally reunites with his family.

Manav-Archana, Arjun-Purvi, and Ankita-Naren together commemorate their "Pavitra Rishta". Manav meets with a fatal accident and Archana dies of grief. Their souls are shown to be in heaven together, expressing their undying love for each other.

Cast

Main
 Ankita Lokhande as
 Archana "Archu" Deshmukh (née Karanjkar)– Sulochana and Manohar's eldest daughter; Vinod, Varsha and Vaishali's sister; Manav's wife; Soham, Ovi and Tejaswini's mother; Jr. Sachin and Purvi's adoptive mother; Pia's maternal grandmother; Ankita, Prashant, Mansi, Pranav and Sonali's paternal grandmother; Pari's adoptive maternal grandmother; Gaurav and Pushti's adoptive paternal grandmother (2009–2014)
 Ankita Karmarkar (née Deshmukh)– Soham's eldest daughter; Prashant and Mansi's sister; Pranav and Sonali's half-sister; Naren's wife; Arushi's mother (2013–2014)
 Sushant Singh Rajput / Hiten Tejwani as Manav Deshmukh – Damodar and Savita's elder son; Sachin and Vandita's brother; Archana's husband; Soham, Ovi and Tejaswini's father; Jr. Sachin and Purvi's adoptive father; Pia, Ankita, Prashant, Mansi, Pranav and Sonali's grandfather; Pari, Gaurav and Pushti's adoptive grandfather (2009–2014)
 Asha Negi as Purvi Kirloskar (née Deshmukh)– Archana and Manav's adopted daughter; Jr. Sachin, Soham, Ovi and Tejaswini's adopted sister; Onir's ex-wife; Arjun's wife; Pari's mother (2011–2014)
 Rithvik Dhanjani as Arjun Kirloskar – Digvijay and Ashna's son; Ovi's ex-husband; Purvi's husband; Pari and Pia's father (2011–2014)
 Shruti Kanwar as Ovi Deshmukh – Archana and Manav's elder daughter; Soham and Tejaswini's sister; Jr. Sachin and Purvi's adopted sister; Arjun's ex-wife; Pia's mother; Savita and Damodar's paternal elder grand-daughter; Sulochana and Manohar's maternal elder grand-daughter;Pari's adoptive maternal aunt; Poornima, Ruchita, Munni and Aniket's cousin; Varun's step-cousin; Gaurav and Pushti's adoptive paternal aunt; Ankita, Mansi, Prashant, Pranav and Sonali's paternal aunt; Arushi and Priya's paternal grand-aunt (2011–2014)
 Mrinalini Tyagi as Tejaswini "Teju" Deshmukh – Archana and Manav's younger daughter; Soham and Ovi's sister; Jr. Sachin and Purvi's adopted sister; Savita and Damodar's paternal younger grand-daughter; Sulochana and Manohar's maternal younger grand-daughter; Poornima, Munni, Ruchita and Aniket's cousin; Varun's step-cousin; Ankita, Mansi, Prashant, Pranav and Sonali's paternal aunt; Pia's maternal aunt; Pari's adoptive maternal aunt; Gaurav and Pushti's adoptive paternal aunt; Arushi and Priya's paternal grand-aunt; Sunny's ex-fiancée (2011–2014)
 Ankit Narang as Soham Manav Deshmukh – Archana and Manav's son; Varsha and Balan's foster son; Ovi and Tejaswini's brother; Jr. Sachin and Purvi's adopted brother; Savita and Damodar's paternal younger grand-son; Poornima, Ruchita, Aniket and Munni's cousin; Varun's step-cousin; Sulochana and Manohar's maternal grand-son; Ratna's ex-husband; Ankita, Prashant, Mansi, Pranav and Sonali's father; Pia's maternal uncle; Pari's adoptive maternal uncle; Gaurav and Pushti's adoptive paternal uncle; Naren's father-in-law; Arushi's maternal grand-father (2012–2014)
 Puru Chibber / Anubhay Srivastava as Jr. Sachin "Sachu" Deshmukh – Sachin and Shravani's son; Archana and Manav's adopted son; Soham, Ovi, Tejaswini and Purvi's adopted brother; Damodar and Savita's elder paternal grand-son; Gauri's ex-fiancé; Neena's husband; Gaurav and Pushti's father; Pia and Pari's adoptive maternal uncle; Ankita, Mansi, Prashant, Pranav and Sonali's adoptive paternal uncle; Manohar and Sulochana's adoptive maternal grand-son (2012–2014)
 Karan Veer Mehra as Narendra Karmarkar – Shirish and Rushali's elder son; Raunak's brother; Pari's ex-husband; Ankita's husband; Arushi's father; Soham's son-in-law; Archana and Manav's paternal grand-son-in-law; Mansi, Prashant, Pranav and Sonali's brother-in-law; Damodar and Savita's paternal great-grand-son-in-law; Sulochana and Manohar's maternal great-grand-son-in-law; Priya's uncle (2013–2014)
 Ruhee Bagga as Pari Kirloskar – Purvi and Arjun's daughter; Pia's half-sister; Naren's ex-wife; Sulochana and Manohar's adoptive maternal great-grand-daughter; Savita and Damodar's adoptive paternal grand-daughter; Archana and Manav's adoptive maternal grand-daughter; Jr. Sachin, Soham, Ovi and Tejaswini's adoptive niece; Gaurav, Prashant, Pranav, Mansi, Sonali, Ankita and Pushti's adoptive paternal cousin (2013–2014)

Recurring
 Savita Prabhune as Sulochana Karanjkar – Manohar's wife; Vinod, Archana, Varsha and Vaishali's mother; Poornima and Ruchita's paternal grandmother; Aniket, Soham, Ovi and Tejaswini's maternal grandmother; Jr. Sachin and Purvi's adoptive maternal grandmother; Pia, Ankita, Prashant, Mansi, Pranav and Sonali's maternal great-grandmother; Pari, Gaurav and Pushti's adoptive maternal great-grandmother; Arushi and Priya's maternal great-great-grandmother (2009–2014)
 Ajay Rohila / Kishori Govind Mahabole as Manohar Karanjkar – Sulochana's husband; Vinod, Archana, Varsha and Vaishali's father; Poornima and Ruchita's paternal grandfather; Aniket, Soham, Ovi and Tejaswini's maternal grandfather; Jr. Sachin and Purvi's adoptive grandfather; Manav, Manjusha, Satish and Dharmesh's father-in-law; Pia, Ankita, Prashant, Mansi, Pranav and Sonali's maternal great-grandfather; Pari, Gaurav and Pushti's adoptive maternal great-grandfather; Arushi and Priya's maternal great-great-grandfather (2009–2011) (Dead)
 Parag Tyagi as Vinod Karanjkar – Sulochana and Manohar's son; Archana, Varsha and Vaishali's brother; Manjusha's husband; Poornima and Ruchita's father; Aniket, Soham, Ovi and Tejaswini's maternal uncle; Munni's paternal uncle; Malik's father-in-law; Gaurav, Pari and Pushti's adoptive maternal uncle; Pia, Ankita, Mansi, Prashant, Pranav and Sonali's maternal grand-uncle; Pari, Gaurav and Pushti's adoptive maternal grand-uncle (2009–2013)
 Priya Marathe as Varsha "Varshu" Deshpande (née Karanjkar)– Sulochana and Manohar's second daughter; Vinod, Archana and Vaishali's sister; Satish's wife; Soham's foster mother and elder maternal aunt; Ovi and Tejaswini's elder maternal aunt; Jr. Sachin and Purvi's adoptive elder maternal aunt; Ankita, Mansi, Prashant, Pranav and Sonali and Pia's elder maternal grand-aunt; Pari, Gaurav and Pushti's adoptive elder maternal aunt; Arushi and Priya's elder maternal great-grand-aunt; Balan's former mistress (2009–2013)
 Prarthana Behere / Madhumita Das as Vaishali "Vaishu" Karanjkar (formerly Jaipurwala) – Sulochana and Manohar's youngest daughter; Vinod, Archana and Varsha's sister; Dharmesh's ex-wife; Aniket's mother; Varun's adoptive mother; Soham, Ovi and Tejaswini's younger maternal aunt; Jr. Sachin and Purvi's adoptive younger maternal aunt; Pia, Ankita, Mansi, Prashant, Pranav and Sonali's younger maternal grand-aunt; Pari, Gaurav and Pushti's adoptive younger maternal grand-aunt; Arushi and Priya's younger maternal great-grand-aunt (2009–2011) (2011–2012)
 Swati Anand as Manjusha Karanjkar (née Lokhande)– Rasika's daughter; Ajit's elder sister; Vinod's wife; Poornima and Ruchita's mother; Manohar and Sulochana's daughter-in-law; Malik's mother-in-law; Archana, Manav, Varsha, Satish, Vandita and Vaishali's sister-in-law; Soham, Ovi, Tejaswini and Aniket's maternal aunt; Ankita, Mansi, Pranav, Prashant, Sonali and Pia's maternal grand-aunt; Jr. Sachin and Purvi's adoptive maternal aunt; Gaurav, Pari and Pushti's adoptive maternal grand-aunt; Arushi and Priya's maternal great-grand-aunt (2009—2013)
 Jia Mustafa as Poornima "Punni" Mittal (née Karanjkar)– Vinod and Manjusha's elder daughter; Ruchita's elder sister; Malik's wife; Archana, Manav Varsha, Satish, Ajit, Vandita and Vaishali's niece; Soham, Ovi, Munni, Tejaswini and Aniket's cousin; Varun's step-cousin; Purvi and Jr. Sachin's adopted cousin; Sulochana and Manohar's elder paternal grand-daughter; Rasika's elder maternal grand-daughter (2011—2013)
 Krunal Pandit as Malik Mittal – Poornima's husband; Manjusha and Vinod's son-in-law; Sulochana and Manohar's grandson-in-law; Ruchita's brother-in-law (2011–2013)
 Meghna Kinare / Shivani Tomar as Ruchita Karanjkar – Vinod and Manjusha's younger daughter; Poornima's younger sister; Archana, Manav, Varsha, Satish and Vaishali's niece; Soham, Ovi, Tejaswini, Aniket and Munni's cousin; Jr. Sachin and Purvi's adopted cousin; Malik's sister-in-law (2011) (2013)
 Smita Oak as Rasika Lokhande – Manjusha and Ajit's mother; Poornima and Ruchita's maternal grandmother; Munni's paternal grandmother; Vandita and Vinod's mother-in-law (2009–2012)
 Yamini Thakur as Vandita "Vandu" Lokhande (née Deshmukh)– Damodar and Savita's daughter; Manav and Sr. Sachin's younger sister; Ajit's wife; Munni's mother; Jr. Sachin, Soham, Ovi and Tejaswini's paternal aunt; Purvi's adoptive paternal aunt; Ankita, Prashant, Mansi, Pranav, Sonali, Pia, Gaurav and Pushti's paternal grand-aunt; Poornima and Ruchita's maternal aunt; Pari's adoptive paternal aunt; Archana, Manjusha and Vinod's sister-in-law; Arushi and Priya's paternal grand-aunt (2009–2013)
 Prabhat Bhattacharya / Pankaj Vishnu as Ajit Lokhande – Rasika's son; Manjusha's younger brother; Vandita's husband; Munni's father; Manav, Archana and Vinod's brother-in-law; Soham, Ovi, Sachin and Tejaswini's paternal uncle; Purvi's adoptive paternal uncle; Gaurav, Pushti, Ankita, Prashant, Pranav, Mansi, Pia and Sonali's paternal grand-uncle; Pari's adoptive paternal grand-uncle (2009–2011, 2013)
 Pragati Chourasiya as Munni Lokhande – Ajit and Vandita's daughter (2011)
 Anurag Sharma as Satish Deshpande – Mohan and Bhavna's son; Varsha's husband (2009–2011)
 Shalini Arora as Bhavna Deshpande – Mohan's wife; Satish's mother (2009–2011)
 Pawan Mahendru as Mohan Deshpande – Bhavna's husband; Satish's father (2009–2011) (Dead)
 Sumit Arora as Dharmesh Jaipurwala – Meena's son; Vaishali's and Madhuri's ex-husband; Varun and Aniket's father (2010–2011)
 Sujata Vaishnav as Meena Jaipurwala – Dharmesh's mother; Varun and Aniket's grandmother (2010–2011)
 Divjot Sabarwal as Madhuri Jaipurwala – Dharmesh's ex-wife; Varun's mother (2011)
 Karan Hukku as Varun Jaipurwala – Dharmesh and Madhuri's son; Vaishali's adopted son; Aniket's half-brother (2011)
 Rahul Tandon as Aniket Jaipurwala – Dharmesh and Vaishali's son; Varun's half-brother (2012–2013)
 Ajay Wadhavkar as Damodar Deshmukh – Vishwas's brother; Savita's husband; Manav, Sachin and Vandita's father; Jr. Sachin, Munni, Soham, Ovi and Tejaswini's grandfather; Purvi's adoptive grandfather; Pia, Ankita, Gaurav, Prashant, Mansi, Pushti, Pranav and Sonali's great-grandfather; Pari's adoptive great-grandfather (2009–2014)
 Usha Nadkarni as Savita Deshmukh – Damodar's wife; Manav, Sachin and Vandita's mother; Jr. Sachin, Munni, Soham, Ovi and Tejaswini's grandmother; Purvi's adoptive grandmother; Pia, Ankita, Gaurav, Prashant, Mansi, Pushti, Pranav and Sonali's great-grandmother; Pari's adoptive great-grandmother (2009–2014)
 Sunil Godse as Vishwasrao Deshmukh – Damodar's brother; Manav, Sachin and Vandita's uncle (2009–2010) (Dead)
 Raj Singh Suryavanshi as Sachin Deshmukh – Damodar and Savita's younger son; Manav and Vandita's brother; Shravani's fiancé; Jr. Sachin's father (2009) (Dead)
 Pooja Pihal as Shravani Mahadik – Girish's daughter; Sachin's fiancée; Jr. Sachin's mother (2009–2011)
 Anil Mishra as Girish Mahadik – Shravani's father (2009–2010)
 Manasi Salvi as Ashna Kirloskar – Digvijay's wife; Arjun's mother; Pari and Pia's grandmother (2011) (Dead)
 Naved Aslam as Digvijay Kirloskar – Manav's boss and friend; Ashna's husband; Arjun's father; Pari and Pia's grandfather (2011–2013)
 Mansi Sharma as Neena Deshmukh – Jr. Sachin's wife; Gaurav and Pushti's mother (2013–2014)
Karishma Sharma as Pia Kirloskar – Ovi and Arjun's daughter; Pari's half-sister (2014)
 Nishant Raghuwanshi as Prashant Deshmukh – Soham's elder son; Ankita and Mansi's brother; Pranav and Sonali's half-brother (2013–2014)
 Aparna Dixit as Mansi Deshmukh Kamble – Soham's second daughter; Ankita and Prashant's sister; Pranav and Sonali's half-sister; Shashank's wife; Priya's mother (2013–2014)
 Manish Naggdev as Shashank Kamble – Mansi's husband; Priya's adoptive father (2013–2014)
 Akash Nath as Pranav Deshmukh – Soham and Ratna's son; Sonali's brother; Ankita, Prashant and Mansi's half-brother (2013–2014)
 Kreesha Shah as Sonali Deshmukh – Soham and Ratna's daughter; Pranav's sister; Ankita, Prashant and Mansi's half-sister (2013–2014)
 Niveen A Ramani as Gaurav Deshmukh – Jr. Sachin and Neena's son; Pushti's brother (2013–2014)
 Jinal Jain as Pushti Deshmukh – Jr. Sachin and Neena's daughter; Gaurav's sister (2013–2014)
 Mandar Jadhav as Vinay Apte – Purvi's ex-fiancé (2012–2013)
 Shakti Arora as Dr. Onir Dutt – Purvi's ex-husband; Shalini's husband (2012–2013)
 Maneka Lalwani as Shalini Dutt - Onir's wife

 Simmi Ghoshal as Young Varsha (2013)
 Karan Sharma as Sunny Khandeshi – Mukesh and Snehlata's younger son; Jignesh's brother; Tejaswini's ex-fiancé (2012–2013)
 Ketki Dave as Snehlata Khandeshi – Mukesh's wife; Sunny and Jignesh's mother; Savita's rival (2012–2013)
 Mark Parakh as Jignesh Khandeshi – Mukesh and Snehlata's elder son; Sunny's brother (2012–2013)
 Priyanka Kandwal as Dr. Gauri Shahane – Umesh and Rajni's daughter; Atul's sister; Archana's doctor; Jr. Sachin and Soham's ex-fiancée (2013) (Dead)
 Sanjay Bhatia as Umesh Shahane – Rajni's husband; Gauri and Atul's father (2013)
 Amita Desai as Rajni Shahane – Umesh's wife; Gauri and Atul's mother (2013)
 Ahmad Harhash as Atul Shahane – Umesh and Rajni's son; Gauri's brother (2013)
 Mahesh Shetty as Jaywant Rane – Swati's brother; Archana's proposed groom (2010)
 Sheeba Chadha as Rushali Karmarkar – Shrish's wife; Naren and Raunak's mother; Priya and Arushi's grandmother (2013–2014)
 Vikrant Chaturvedi as Shirish Karmarkar – Sunanda's brother; Rushali's husband; Naren and Raunak's father; Priya and Arushi's grandfather (2013–2014)
 Sumukhi Pendsey as Sunanda Karmarkar – Shirish's sister; Naren and Raunak's aunt (2013–2014)
 Ranjeet Singh as Raunak Karmarkar – Rushali and Shirish's younger son; Naren's brother; Kinnari's husband; Priya's father (2013–2014)
 Minal Mogam as Kinnari Karmarkar – Raunak's wife (2013–2014)
 Angel as Arushi Karmarkar – Ankita and Naren's daughter (2014)
 Karan Suchak as Shekhar Gupta – Lawyer; Naren's friend; Pari's ex-fiancé (2013–2014)
 Amit Sareen as Ashwin Sagar – Satish's cousin; Varsha's lover; Urmila's husband (2009–2010)
 Ashlesha Sawant as Urmila Sagar – Ashwin's wife (2009–2010)
 Neha Sehgal as Ria Gupta – Manav's assistant (2010–2011)
 Mukul Harish as Ranvijay – Gopal and Neelima's younger son; Vishnu's brother; Vaishnavi's father (2014)
 Bhanujeet Sudan as Rishabh Kapoor – A businessman; Sonia's former husband; Purvi's obsessed lover (2013–2014) (Dead)
 Kali Prasad Mukherjee / Abhay Bhargava as Balan Lala Singh – Varsha's pretend husband; Soham's adoptive father (2012–2013) (2013–2014)
 Tanvi Thakkar as Rashmi (2009–2010)
 Syed Zafar Ali as Dr. Agarwal (2013)
 Eva Shirali as Swati Rane (2009–2010)
 Irfan Razaa Khan as Prakash (2010)
 Savita Shivaskar as Sundari (2011–2014)
 Aryan Prajapati as Nikhil (2013–2014)
 Anuradha Namdar as Charulata Mehta (2012–2013)
 Mohit Sehgal as Pradeep Saini (2013)
 Suman Shastri Kant as Kinshuk Banerjee (2013)

Production
Sushant Singh Rajput who was playing the parallel lead in Kis Desh Mein Hai Meraa Dil of StarPlus was cast as Manav. Zee TV did not accept him for casting as Manav as he was a parallel lead of the show in their rival channel. But Producer Ekta Kapoor convinced the channel to accept him. In November 2011 Rajput quit the series and was replaced by Hiten Tejwani. However, during the final of the series on 25 October 2014, Tejwani paved way for Rajput who appeared in the final episode as Manav.

Schedule
The show's time slot was changed from 21:00 to 18:30 in 15 April 2014 and the 21:00 slot was taken by Kumkum Bhagya, also produced by Ekta Kapoor.

Reception
Around late 2008, producer Ekta Kapoor and her production house Balaji Telefilms declined when the ratings and popularity of all her hit soaps of the 2000s decreased and were axed and also when newly launched ones performed poorly. Since then most channels did not accept her to work. It was due to the chance given by Zee TV for this series, the career of Kapoor and her production house was revived when it became one of the top-rated Hindi television programs.

Accolades

Pavitra Rishta received several awards and nominations. Lokhande and Rajput received multiple awards for their roles Archana and Manav in the Best Actress and Best Actor categories, as has Nadkarni in the Best Negative Actress category and Ekta Kapoor in the Best Serial category.

Broadcast

 In India, the series is re-aired on Zee TV from September 3, 2020 due to popular demand.
 In Pakistan, it was aired on Geo Entertainment under the title "Na Tootay Rishta" for few months but than channel ended the show abruptly.
 In Vietnam, the show was broadcast on Vietnam Television and HuongVietTV  under the name "Tình yêu và định mệnh".
 The show is dubbed in English at Urban Brew Studios South Africa and was Aired from Monday to Friday under the name Scared Ties On Zee World.
 The show currently airs on Apna Television in New Zealand with English subtitles, Mon–Fri 9:00pm.
 The show is dubbed in French and broadcast in the Southern African region and Mascareignes Island on Zee Magic.
 It is also broadcast in Mauritius on MBC 2 and its sister channel MBC 4 .
 In Indonesia, the show was broadcast on antv under name "Archana Mencari Cinta" (Archana Searching Love)
 In Bulgaria, the show was broadcast on Nova TV under name "Завинаги свързани" (Connected Forever)
 Since September 3, 2018, the show is re-aired in double episodes (two episodes at one airing) every Monday to Friday at 04:00 PM IST on Zee TV SD on popular demand.
 The series is also streaming on Zee5 in 2020 after the tragic death of one of its main actor, Sushant Singh Rajput on 14 June 2020.
 In Turkey, it aired on Kanal 7 under the title "Baş Tacım" from 21 June 2021 to 9 August 2022.

Adaptations

References

External links
 Pavitra Rishta at ZEE5
 

Balaji Telefilms television series
Zee TV original programming
Indian television soap operas
2009 Indian television series debuts
2014 Indian television series endings
Hindi-language television series based on Tamil-language television series